Duluth Entertainment Convention Center (DECC) is a multi-purpose arena and convention center complex located in Duluth, Minnesota. It was home to the University of Minnesota Duluth Bulldog hockey team from 1966 to 2010. The DECC is located on the waterfront near Duluth's famous Aerial Lift Bridge.

DECC Arena
The DECC Arena, originally called the Duluth Arena Auditorium, was built at a cost of $6.5 million, the arena portion of the complex houses a 190-by-85 foot hockey rink with 5,333 seats, and six locker rooms, including the recently remodeled $2 million locker room facility now used by the men and women Bulldog hockey teams.

The rink can be converted to allow the DECC Arena to host concerts, dinners, conventions, and shows. The DECC was the site of the NCAA I men's hockey championships in both 1968 and 1981, hosted the 2003 and 2008 Women's NCAA Division I Frozen Four. A spacious lobby, where ticket sales originate, separates the Arena from Symphony Hall. Symphony Hall seats 2,400 and plays host to concerts, symphonies, plays, operas, high school and college graduations, and a variety of other activities.

Pioneer Hall
Pioneer Hall was added in 1976, and contains a hockey rink with smaller seating capability utilizing fold-out bleacher seating. Pioneer Hall is also the home of the Duluth Curling Club with eight curling rinks (can be expanded to provide up to 13 curling sheets for major events) and a lounge area. It is the largest curling venue in the United States, and has hosted two World Championships, the US Olympic Trials, and numerous National events. The Duluth Curling Club is the second largest curling club in the United States.

Convention center
In the mid-1990s a $30 million convention center was added, which is the site of numerous social, business and entertainment events, and features the  Lake Superior Ballroom, the  Harborside Ballroom, and 25 Meeting Rooms.

AMSOIL Arena

The 2008 Minnesota bonding bill included $38 million for the "DECC expansion project". The DECC expansion included a new multi-purpose arena for the UMD men's and women's ice hockey teams, The arena was an increase in seating capacity by 2,100 from the original DECC Arena and seats 6,600 for ice hockey and 8,500 for concerts. The expansion project also included a new parking ramp and more space for conventions and concerts, which DECC director Dan Russell said will bring more events to the complex. Construction began in September (2008), and the AMSOIL Arena opened on December 30, 2010 for a Men's UMD hockey game against the University of North Dakota.  The new arena was named AMSOIL Arena.

References

External links 
Duluth Entertainment Convention Center website
Bulldogs in the NHL

College ice hockey venues in the United States
Sports venues in Minnesota
Convention centers in Minnesota
Buildings and structures in Duluth, Minnesota
Tourist attractions in Duluth, Minnesota
Indoor ice hockey venues in Minnesota
1966 establishments in Minnesota
Curling in Minnesota
Sports venues in the Duluth–Superior metropolitan area